Conesville may refer to a place in the United States:

Conesville, Iowa
Conesville, New York
Conesville, Ohio
Conesville Power Plant, a power plant located near the namesake village of Conesville, Ohio